Let's Not Keep in Touch is a 1994 Italian comedy film written, directed by and starring Carlo Verdone.

For this film Asia Argento was awarded with a David di Donatello for Best Actress.

Plot 
Gepy 'Fuxas' is the famous host of a television talk show for RAI in Rome. He has built his fame on the populist pursue of highly emotional scoops, trivializing the real problems of his public and faking over-the-top drama in order to increase his audience.
One day a paraplegic girl, Arianna, exposes during the show Gepy's hypocrisy and his instrumental abuses of his guests' private life. The scandal leads to the show being canceled and Gepy being fired by the national broadcasting company. He tries in vain to recover his public image, and to find a second wind for his career, eventually accepting a job offer from a much smaller private network. The vulgarity of the program leads however him to abandon the show already during recordings of the pilot.

While Gepy's professional efforts aren't successful, on the personal side he starts to date Arianna and to gradually develop a more mature conscience. Their relationship however remains full of struggles, since Arianna remains very jealous of her independence, and Gepy seems unable to really accept her handicap as a permanent condition, aside which the girl however leads a very normal life. After reading by chance about a miraculous new therapy, he tricks Arianna to join him for a short vacation in Prague, and only on-site he reveals the real goal of their trip. After this unsuccessful attempt, the two appear to reconcile with their conditions and each others.

Cast
 Carlo Verdone as Gepy Fuxas
 Asia Argento as Arianna
 Aldo Maccione as Antonazzi
 Sonia Gessner as Magda
 Cosima Costantini as Ambra
 Anita Bartolucci as Elda

See also
 List of Italian films of 1994

References

External links
 

1994 films
1994 comedy films
Films about paraplegics or quadriplegics
Films about television people
Films directed by Carlo Verdone
Films set in Prague
Films set in Rome
Films set in Veneto
Films shot in Prague
Films shot in Rome
Italian comedy films
1990s Italian-language films
1990s Italian films